Écomusée vosgien de la brasserie  is a museum and brewery in Ville-sur-Illon, Vosges, France. It was established in 1887.

Brasserie
Beer in France
1887 establishments in France
Ecomuseums